Tanimoto (written:  or ) is a Japanese surname. Notable people with the surname include:

, Japanese judoka
, Japanese baseball player
, Japanese Methodist minister
Larry Tanimoto, American politician
, Japanese politician
Masayuki Tanimoto, Japanese engineer
, Japanese long distance runner
, Japanese singer
, Japanese politician

Japanese-language surnames